House of Sand and Fog is a 2003 American psychological drama film directed by Vadim Perelman. The screenplay by Perelman and Shawn Lawrence Otto is based on the novel of the same name by Andre Dubus III.

The story concerns the battle between a young woman and an immigrant Iranian family over the ownership of a house in Northern California, which ultimately leads to the destruction of five lives. The film was nominated for three Academy Awards: Best Actor (Ben Kingsley), Best Supporting Actress (Shohreh Aghdashloo), and Best Original Score (James Horner).

Plot
Abandoned by her husband, recovering drug addict Kathy Nicolo, living alone in a small house near the San Francisco Bay Area, ignores eviction notices erroneously sent to her for nonpayment of business taxes. Assuming the misunderstanding was cleared up, she is surprised when Sheriff's Deputy Lester Burdon arrives to forcibly evict her. Telling Kathy that her home is to be auctioned off, Lester feels sympathy for her, helps her move out, and advises her to seek legal assistance to regain her house.

Former Imperial Iranian Army colonel Massoud Amir Behrani, who fled his homeland with his family, now lives in the Bay Area working multiple menial jobs. Living beyond his means, he maintains the façade of a respectable businessman so as not to shame his wife Nadereh, son Esmail, and daughter Soraya. He buys Kathy's house for a quarter of its actual value, intending to improve and sell it. Kathy is evicted from the motel she is staying in. With nowhere else to go, she spends the night in her car. Seeing the renovations and how the Behranis have settled in makes her determined to get her house back and she finds an attorney, Connie Walsh, who assures her that because of the county's mistake, they will return Massoud's money and restore the house to her.

Massoud, having already spent money on improving the house, is unwilling to accept anything less than the higher value of the property, which the county refuses to pay. Connie advises Kathy that her only option is now to sue the county, though it will take months. Kathy tries to convince Massoud to sell back the house; he too advises her to sue the county and promises to sell her the house back if she comes up with the money, but she retaliates by beginning to harass him and his family in front of potential buyers. Desperate for help, Kathy falls easily into an affair with Lester, who abandons his wife and children and fashions himself as Kathy's protector. Under a pseudonym, Lester threatens to have Massoud and his family deported if he refuses to sell the house back to the county. Aware that Lester was acting on Kathy's behalf, Massoud reports this to Internal Affairs, who severely reprimand Lester, and furiously warns Kathy to leave his family alone. Kathy calls her brother Frank for help, but cannot bring herself to admit that she is homeless.

Despondent, she becomes drunk and attempts suicide in the driveway with Lester's sidearm. Massoud finds her drunkenly unable to discharge the gun, and brings her inside. Kathy tries to kill herself again with pills, but Nadereh saves her. As she and her husband carry Kathy to the bedroom, Lester breaks in and sees Kathy unconscious. In a xenophobic rage, Lester locks the Behranis in their own bathroom, refusing to let them out until Massoud agrees to relinquish the house. Massoud offers to sell the house and will give Kathy the money in exchange for her putting the house in his name. Lester takes Massoud to the county office to finalize the transaction.

Outside the office, Lester begins to manhandle Massoud and Esmail seizes Lester's gun and aims it at him. Massoud grabs Lester and begins calling for help from nearby police officers, but they misinterpret the situation and shoot Esmail instead of Lester. Massoud is arrested but is released after Lester confesses to his crimes and is detained.

Massoud begs God to save his son but Esmail does not survive. Believing they have nothing left to live for, Massoud kills Nadereh by lacing her tea with pills. He then dons his old military uniform, tapes a plastic dust cover over his head, and asphyxiates himself while clutching his wife's hand. Kathy discovers the couple and frantically attempts to resuscitate Massoud but she is too late. As the bodies of Massoud and Nadereh are taken away by paramedics, a policeman asks Kathy if the house is hers. After a long pause, she admits that it is not.

Cast
 Jennifer Connelly as Kathy Nicolo
 Ben Kingsley as Colonel Amir Massud Behrani
 Shohreh Aghdashloo as Nadereh "Nadi" Behrani
 Ron Eldard as Lester Burdon
 Frances Fisher as Connie Walsh
 Jonathan Ahdout as Esmail Behrani
 Kim Dickens as Carol Burdon
 Carlos Gómez as Lieutenant Alvarez
 Navi Rawat as Soraya Behrani
Al Rodrigo as Torez
Marco Rodríguez as Mendez
Aki Aleong as Tran
Cooper Thornton as Gary
Ray Abruzzo as Frank
Spencer Garrett as Auctioneer

Production
Shohreh Aghdashloo was a respected actress in Iran before immigrating to the United States. When the film roles offered to her were limited to terrorists and other assorted villains, she turned to a career in the theater. This film marked her return to the screen after nearly two decades.

Jonathan Ahdout, whose previous acting experience was limited to school plays, was cast as Esmail Behrani two days prior to the start of filming. His original audition had not impressed Vadim Perelman, but when he began to have doubts about the actor he ultimately had hired, he reviewed the audition tapes and saw something in Ahdout's performance he felt he previously had overlooked. He called him back and had him meet and perform with Aghdashloo. The chemistry between them convinced Perelman the boy was right for the part.

Soundtrack
An original soundtrack album featuring James Horner's film score, was released by Varèse Sarabande.

Reception

Critical response
The film received positive reviews from critics. Based on 182 reviews collected by the film review aggregator Rotten Tomatoes, 74% of critics gave House of Sand and Fog a positive review (135 "Fresh"; 47 "Rotten"), with an average rating of 7.08/10. The website's critical consensus states, "Powerful and thought provoking film". On Metacritic, the film holds a score of 71 out of 100, sampled from 41 critics' reviews, indicating "generally favorable reviews".

In his review in The New York Times, A. O. Scott called the film "an impressively self-assured directing debut" and added, "[it] is the nearly flawless execution of a deeply flawed premise. Mr. Perelman inadvertently exposes the inconsistencies in Mr. Dubus's novel even as he comes very close to overcoming them ... the conflict between Kathy and Behrani arises from a sin so trivial as to be almost comical ... and every stage of its escalation seems determined less by the psychology of the characters than by the forced, schematic logic of the story. You feel the heavy, implacable force of the narrative without quite believing it."

Roger Ebert of the Chicago Sun-Times gave the film four out of four stars and wrote, "Here is a film that seizes us with its first scene and never lets go, and we feel sympathy all the way through for everyone in it ... it stands with integrity and breaks our hearts." Owen Gleiberman of Entertainment Weekly rated the film B− with the comment, "[it] has its pretensions, but mostly it's a vigorous and bracingly acted melodrama spun off from a situation that's pure human-thriller catnip ... though I do wish that the movie didn't spiral into the most shocking of tragedies."

Peter Travers of Rolling Stone rated it three out of a possible four stars and added, "Before it runs off course into excess, this brilliantly acted film version of the 1999 novel by Andre Dubus III moves with a stabbing urgency ... Vadim Perelman ... makes a smashing debut in features ... Prepare for an emotional wipeout." In The New Yorker, David Denby wrote: "Ben Kingsley ... [is] the only entertainment in this noble pool of despair ... Vadim Perelman ... produces scenes of great intensity, but he doesn't capture the colloquial ease and humor of American life."

On Salon.com, Andrew O'Hehir said it "features an astonishing pair of lead performances and one of this year's most impressive directing debuts." Channel 4 said, "There's nothing wrong in funneling operatic tragedy through seemingly mundane domestic battles, but the way events escalate here feels deeply fraudulent ... heavy-handed allegory and symbolism wait at every turn ... though relentlessly downbeat, this is so overwrought, underdeveloped and ham-fisted that it's more unintentionally comic than genuinely tragic."

Box office
The film began a limited release in the United States on December 19, 2003, and opened at #43, grossing $45,572 in its opening weekend. It eventually grossed $13,040,288 in North America and $3,902,507 in other territories for a worldwide total of $16,942,795. Its budget was $16.5 million.

Accolades

See also

 Cinema of the United States
 List of American films of 2003

References

External links

 
 
 
 
 
 Jennifer Connelly interview 

2003 films
2003 drama films
American drama films
2000s English-language films
2000s Persian-language films
Films about immigration to the United States
Films based on American novels
Films set in the 1990s
Films set in the San Francisco Bay Area
DreamWorks Pictures films
Films scored by James Horner
Films about miscarriage of justice
Murder–suicide in films
2003 directorial debut films
Films directed by Vadim Perelman
2003 multilingual films
American multilingual films
2000s American films